Epimetasia eoa is a moth in the family Crambidae. It was described by Edward Meyrick in 1936. It is found in Iraq.

References

Moths described in 1936
Odontiini